Geraldine Van Bibber  (born July 3, 1951) is a Canadian politician representing the Yukon electoral district of Porter Creek North as a member of the Yukon Party. She was elected as part of the 2016 Yukon election.

Van Bibber served as the commissioner of Yukon from 2005 to 2010 and a member of the Gwichʼin First Nation. She has also served as Chancellor of Yukon College and Administrator of the Yukon.

Prior to being appointed to office, Van Bibber worked for the Yukon Department of Finance. She was also instrumental in the formation of the Yukon First Nations Culture and Tourism Association, as a private tour operator.

She was re-elected at the 2021 Yukon general election.

Political career

Van Bibber announced her intention to seek the Yukon Party nomination in its stronghold riding of Porter Creek North in the 2016 Yukon election, which had been vacated after the incumbent Yukon Party representative, Doug Graham, announced his retirement. Although highly unusual for a former Commissioner to run for elected office - given the position's non-partisan nature - she was not the Yukon's first Commissioner to later seek elected office, and was already serving in a partisan role at the time as Senior Advisor to the Premier in the Yukon Party Cabinet Offices. She was elected to the Yukon Legislature for the riding of Porter Creek North on November 7, 2016.

Van Bibber is currently a member of the Standing Committee on Statutory Instruments and the Standing Committee on Appointments to Major Government Boards and Committees. She is also the Yukon Party caucus critic for the Department of Education, the Aboriginal relations branch of the Executive Council Office, and the Department of Tourism and Culture.

Honours

Van Bibber was appointed a Commander of the Order of St. John in 2006 and was appointed as a member of the Order of Canada - one of Canada's highest civilian honours - in 2016. Her citation into the Order of Canada recognizes her "role in making the territory a travel-destination by coordinating its tourism industry and broadening awareness of its unique Indigenous cultures."

Van Bibber is also a recipient of the Queen's Diamond Jubilee Medal.

Electoral record

2021 general election

2016 general election

|-

 

|-
! align=left colspan=3|Total
! align=right|989
! align=right|100.0%
! align=right |

References

1951 births
Living people
21st-century Canadian politicians
21st-century Canadian women politicians
21st-century First Nations people
Canadian university and college chancellors
Commissioners of Yukon
First Nations politicians
First Nations women in politics
Gwich'in people
Members of the Order of Canada
People from Dawson City
Politicians from Whitehorse
Women MLAs in Yukon
Yukon Party MLAs